Bombycoidea is a superfamily of moths. It contains the silk moths, emperor moths, sphinx moths, and relatives. The Lasiocampoidea are close relatives and were historically sometimes merged in this group. After many years of debate and shifting taxonomies, the most recent classifications treat the superfamily as containing 10 constituent families. Their larvae often exhibit horns.

References

 
Lepidoptera superfamilies
Macroheterocera